Dichomeris horoglypta is a moth in the family Gelechiidae. It was described by Edward Meyrick in 1932. It is found on the Japanese islands of Honshu, Shikoku and in Korea.

The forewings are ochreous with dark fuscous streaks along the anterior margin, with a dark fuscous costal patch at three-fourths. There is also a dark fuscous S-shaped fascia along the dorsum, as well as two short blackish parallel streaks longitudinally.

The larvae feed on Indigofera pseudotenctoria.

References

Moths described in 1932
horoglypta